Kim O'Keeffe is an Australian politician belonging to the Nationals who is the current member for the district of Shepparton in the Victorian Legislative Assembly. She won the seat in the 2022 state election over Suzanna Sheed.

Prior to her running for state parliament, she was the mayor of the City of Greater Shepparton.

References

Living people
Members of the Victorian Legislative Assembly
Women members of the Victorian Legislative Assembly
National Party of Australia members of the Parliament of Victoria
21st-century Australian politicians
Year of birth missing (living people)
21st-century Australian women politicians